Trg od Oružja (Cyrillic: Трг од оружја; meaning "The Arms Square") is the main and the largest town square in Kotor, Montenegro. It hosts several stores, banks, cafés, bakeries and pastry shops, as well as many important cultural-historical monuments. Its name hails from Venetian times, when munitions were made and stored here.

Notable sights

The Sea Gate 
The Sea Gate (Montenegrin: Vrata od Mora, Врата од Мора) or the West Gate (Zapadna vrat''', Западна врата) is the main entrance to the Old Town of Kotor. The Gate was built in the 16th century and is the biggest of the town's three gates.

 Rector's Palace 
The Rector's Palace (Montenegrin: Kneževa (Providurova) palata, Кнежева (Провидурова) палата) was built in the 17th century. It shores up the square's western side and is currently a part of the luxury Hotel Cattaro.

 Napoleon's Theatre 
The Napoleon's Theatre (Montenegrin: Napoleonovo pozorište, Наполеоново позориште) was one of the first theatres constructed in the Balkans and functioned as such until the late nineteenth century. The building itself was built in the 17th century and was turned into a theatre in 1810. During the 20th century, it functioned as the Town Hall, and today it accommodates Hotel Cattaro's'' reception.

Clock Tower 
The Clock Tower was built in the 17th century. It was built partly in Baroque style, while the northern and eastern facades were built in Gothic style. A reconstructed medieval pillory stands in front of the tower.

References 

Squares in Kotor
Kotor
Venetian period in the history of Montenegro